Alan Cristian Arario (born 1 April 1995) is an Argentine footballer who plays for Italian Eccellenza club ASD Frattamaggiore Calcio.

Career

Club career
On 13 December 2019 it was confirmed, that Arario had joined Italian Eccellenza club ASD Frattamaggiore Calcio.

References

External links
 
 

1995 births
Living people
Footballers from Buenos Aires
Argentine footballers
Argentine expatriate footballers
Club Atlético River Plate footballers
Atlético Madrid footballers
A.S. Roma players
Club Atlético Vélez Sarsfield footballers
Dorados de Sinaloa footballers
Club Deportivo Palestino footballers
U.S. Vibonese Calcio players
Chilean Primera División players
Ascenso MX players
Argentine Primera División players
Serie D players
Eccellenza players
Association football forwards
Argentine expatriate sportspeople in Spain
Argentine expatriate sportspeople in Italy
Argentine expatriate sportspeople in Chile
Argentine expatriate sportspeople in Mexico
Expatriate footballers in Spain
Expatriate footballers in Italy
Expatriate footballers in Chile
Expatriate footballers in Mexico